An acoustic board is a board made from sound absorbing materials, designed to provide sound insulation. Between two outer walls sound absorbing material is inserted and the wall is porous. Thus, when sound passes through an acoustic board, the intensity of sound is decreased. The loss of sound energy is balanced by producing heat energy.

Uses
They are used in auditoriums, halls, seminar rooms, libraries, courts and wherever sound insulation is needed. Acoustic boards are also used in speaker boxes.

See also
Acoustics
Architectural acoustics
Room acoustics
Absorption (acoustics)

References

External links
 Acoustic Board

Acoustics
Building engineering